Life Is Wonderful is a 2018 Dutch romantic comedy film directed by Frans Weisz. It was based on the book of the same name by Remco Campert, written in 1961. In July 2018, it was one of nine films shortlisted to be the Dutch entry for the Best Foreign Language Film at the 91st Academy Awards, but it was not selected.

Cast
 Tine Joustra as Mother Mees
 Willeke van Ammelrooy as Rosa Overbeek
 Anniek Pheifer as Etta
 Romy Lauwers as Panda

References

External links
 

2018 films
2018 romantic comedy films
Dutch romantic comedy films
2010s Dutch-language films